Frasi & fumo is the third studio album by Italian singer-songwriter Nina Zilli. It was released in Italy on 12 February 2015 through Universal Music. The album peaked at number 15 on the Italian Albums Chart.

Singles
"Sola" was released as the lead single on 12 February 2015. The song peaked at number 50 on the Italian Singles Chart. The song was Zilli's entry for the Sanremo Music Festival 2015, the 65th edition of Italy's musical festival which doubles also as a selection of the act for Eurovision Song Contest. "#RLL (Riprenditi le lacrime)" was released as the second single on 3 April 2015.

Track listing
Credits adapted from Tidal.

Charts

Release history

References

2015 albums
Nina Zilli albums